Edward Flanders "Pete" Ackley (July 21, 1887 – October 2, 1964) was an American lawyer, politician, and football coach. He served in the Wisconsin State Senate from 1913 to 1916.

Early life and education
Ackley was born on July 21, 1887 in Chippewa Falls, Wisconsin. He graduated from Chippewa Falls High School before attending the University of Minnesota Law School. He married Clara M. Christenson around 1912.

Career
Ackley represented the 28th district in the Senate from 1913 to 1916. He was a Republican, a defeated William H. Frawley in November 1912 election.

In September 1926, Ackley was hired as the head football coach at Whitworth University in Spokane, Washington. He also coached baseball at Whitworth in the spring of 1927.

Around 1929, Ackley moved to Oregon to practice law. He served as the city attorney for Brookings, Oregon from 1953 to 1956. Oregon governor Elmo Smith appointed Ackley as district attorney of Curry County, Oregon in July 1956.

Death
Ackley died on October 2, 1964, while visiting relative in Santa Cruz, California.

References

External links
 

1887 births
1964 deaths
20th-century American politicians
Baseball coaches from Wisconsin
Coaches of American football from Wisconsin
District attorneys in Oregon
High school football coaches in Wisconsin
Oregon Republicans
People from Curry County, Oregon
Politicians from Chippewa Falls, Wisconsin
University of Minnesota Law School alumni
Whitworth Pirates baseball coaches
Whitworth Pirates football coaches
Wisconsin lawyers
Republican Party Wisconsin state senators